Khrongkhraeng krop is traditional Thai dessert that is a dry, crisp favourite. It is made from dough and fried. The main ingredients are wheat flour, eggs, coconut milk, salt, sugar, vegetable oil, garlic, chili, parsley root and pepper. The taste of khrongkhraeng krop is a little spicy from peppers with the scent of garlic with cilantro root.

References
Thai Fried Cookie (Klong-Klang Krob). Retrieved October 1. 2016. from http://en.foodtravel.tv/recfoodShow_Detail.aspx?viewId=744
ครองแครงกรอบ Retrieved October 8. 2016. from http://jomkuannn.blogspot.com/p/blog-page_6139.html
ขนมครองแครงกรอบ Retrieved October 15. 2016. from http://www.m-culture.in.th/album/166518/ขนมครองแครงกรอบ
Krong-Krang (Thai Fried Cookie). Retrieved October 1. 2016. from https://www.bigoven.com/recipe/krong-krang-thai-fried-cookie/104473
Krong Krang Grob. Retrieved October 1. 2016. from http://khun-mae.blogspot.com/2013/05/krong-krang-grob.html

Thai desserts and snacks